Japan Railway Journal is a TV program from NHK World TV documenting rail transport in Japan that started broadcasting on March 8, 2015.

Overview 
The program showcases the charm and the cutting-edge technology of rail transport in Japan. New episodes are broadcast 1 to 2 times a month.

At first, many of the talking sections were filmed in a bar with a train diorama, "Bar Ginza Panorama" in Shinjuku. Now, filming these sections on-location at the featured rail facilities is more common.

Due to the COVID-19 pandemic, NHK World has been showing Japan Railway Journal repeats in lieu of new episodes. The combination of studio presentation and on-site reporting makes it difficult for video production.

Broadcast times 

 First broadcast: Fridays 0:30 - 1:00 JST on NHK World TV
 Rebroadcasts:
 NHK World TV (JST): Fridays 6:30 - 7:00 ; 12:30 - 13:00; 18:30 - 19:00
 BS1 (JST): Wednesdays 3:00 - 3:30 (From 2016 - broadcasts may be cancelled due to sports programs)
 Broadcasts outside Japan will come 5 days after Japan at the earliest, but on weeks with no new programs, older ones will be rebroadcast.

Actors 

 Presenter: Cathy Cat (2021-)
 Commentators: Takagi Ryo, Ph.D. (Professor at Kogakuin University) and various female tarento who like railways (see "Guest" column of the episode list)

Previous actors
 Presenter: Nathan Berry (2018-2020)
 Presenter: Russell Totten (until 2017)
 Assistant: Sarah MacDonald (in 2017)

Main topics 

 Special Rail Report
 Section which features that week's main topic.
 Railway Topics
 Short segment which features the latest themes in railways.
 Hands-on Railway History
 Russell Totten visits railway museums in Japan and presents railway history.
 Avid Rail Communities
 Russell Totten and a female guest showcase a community related to railways in Japan.

Episode list 

YouTube Playlist of all publicly available episodes (This is not NHK official playlist. Please read playlist comment.)

See also 
See the World by Train

References

External links 
 
 

NHK original programming
2015 Japanese television series debuts
Documentary television series about railway transport
English-language television shows
Railway culture in Japan